Forkston Mountain is a mountain located in Wyoming County, Pennsylvania. This mountain is located in the region of Pennsylvania known as the Endless Mountains. Forkston Mountain is a part of the Allegheny Plateau and rises over the Susquehanna River. Forkston Mountain has a fire tower located at the summit.

References

 

Mountains of Pennsylvania
Landforms of Wyoming County, Pennsylvania